Terminal Peak is a mountain in South West Tasmania. 

It lies on the north east end of the Frankland Range jutting out towards the east from a ridge off the range towards the impoundment Lake Pedder.  It is east of Mount Lloyd Jones and north west of Mount Jim Brown.  It overlooks Mount Solitary, which is surrounded by Lake Pedder.

See also
 Lake Pedder
 Strathgordon, Tasmania
 South West Wilderness, Tasmania

References

 Solitary 4224, Edition 1 2001, Tasmania 1:25000 Series, Tasmap

Mountains of Tasmania
South West Tasmania